Cyril Musil (26 November 1907, Studnice – 17 April 1977, Collingwood) was a Czechoslovakian cross-country skier who competed in the 1930s.

Career
Musil won a silver medal in the 4 x 10 km at the 1933 FIS Nordic World Ski Championships in Innsbruck.

At the 1936 Winter Olympics in Garmisch-Partenkirchen he finished ninth in the 50 km event and 14th in the 18 km competition. As a member of the Czechoslovak team he finished fifth in the 4x10 km relay event.

References

External links
World Championship results 

1907 births
1977 deaths
People from Nové Město na Moravě
Czech male cross-country skiers
Czechoslovak male cross-country skiers
Olympic cross-country skiers of Czechoslovakia
Cross-country skiers at the 1936 Winter Olympics
FIS Nordic World Ski Championships medalists in cross-country skiing
Czech emigrants to Canada
Czechoslovak defectors
Sportspeople from the Vysočina Region